The Granoff School of Music is a music school in Philadelphia, Pennsylvania. It was founded by Isadore Granoff (1902 - 2000), a Ukrainian immigrant.

Alumni of Granoff include Dizzy Gillespie, Sonny Fortune, and John Coltrane. Some of his students later became well-known classical, jazz, swing, big band and Latin musicians.

Granoff's studio was originally in his row-house in South Philadelphia at 8th and Porter Streets, where the parlor served as waiting room, and the lessons were given in the adjoining dining room, furnished with a couple of music stands and an old upright piano. In 1928, he relocated his studio to the Presser Building at 17th and Chestnut Streets in Center City (central Philadelphia). The upper stories of that building were partitioned, and contained studios for voice and instrumentalists. It was here that his studio, originally for lessons in classical violin, metamorphosed, in the late 1930s, into the broader music school. Granoff sold the music school in 1970.

References

Educational institutions in the United States with year of establishment missing
Music schools in Pennsylvania
Schools in Philadelphia
Defunct schools in Pennsylvania
1970 disestablishments in Pennsylvania